Shyamoli Textile Engineering College (STEC) is one of the private textile education schools in Bangladesh which operates under the Faculty of Engineering and Technology, University of Dhaka. Admission procedure is regulated by the university and fundings are granted by the department of textiles, government of the people's republic of Bangladesh.

History
Shyamoli Textile Engineering College has a long history. In 1979, Shyamoli ldeal Technical College(SITC) was established at Shyamoli to meet technical education by offering technical course. ln order to meet the challenge of increasing demand of new sophisticated & latest technology, SITC Chairman decided to upgrade this institution to Diploma Engineering lnstitute in 2000 to offer 4 Years Diploma in Engineering Degree by affiliation with the Bangladesh Technical Education Board and named it as Shyamoli ldeal Polytechnic lnstitute (SIPI).
To contribute to Bangladesh and World through excellence in scientific and technical education and research in the Textile sector; to serve as a valuable resource for industry and society; and remain a source of pride for all Bangladeshis, this institution was upgraded to B.Sc. Engineering College in 2010 to offer 4 Years bachelor's degree in Textile Engineering by affiliation with the University of Dhaka and named it as Shyamoli Textile Engineering College. Since then the academic curriculums are going on at full pace.

Campus
Shyamoli Textile Engineering College (STEC) is located at Mohammadpur in Capital City Dhaka.

It's in Chad Uddan residential area, Road-1. It's a bit remote from the urban lifestyle.

Accommodation
The STEC has the hostel facility both for boys & girls students. It has two hostel buildings of its own. Each is well furnished 4-storied building. One is dedicated for male students with canteen facility and common room. Another is for female students. Every room of the hostel has attached bath and toilet and sufficient number of furniture to accommodate students. The common room, canteen, sounds and attractive atmosphere of the area is helpful for carrying out study by the students pleasantly.

Academics

Departments

Textile Engineering Departments are-
 Department of Yarn Manufacturing Engineering (YME)
 Department of Fabric Manufacturing Engineering (FME)
 Department of Wet Process Engineering (WPE)
 Department of Apparel Manufacturing Engineering (AME)
Department of Computer Science and Engineering
Department of Electrical and Electronics Engineering
Department of Fashion Design and Apparel Engineering

Undergraduate courses

Medium of instruction
The medium of instruction is in English for all the academic students.

Curriculum
 A total of 164 credits of which the major course will be consist of 117 credits of the theoretical courses, 36 credits of practical, 9 credits of field work, industrial attachment and project and 2 credits for viva-voce. For graduation, a student has to complete all the credits according to the syllabus prescribed by the Faculty of Engineering and Technology, University of Dhaka for the session the student has been registered or admitted.

Admission procedures and entry requirements

Undergraduate courses
A candidate must have to attend the admission test given by Technology Unit of University of Dhaka to get admitted into undergraduate programme of Shyamoli Textile Engineering College. One candidate in the HSC+SSC examination should have passed with minimum GPA 6. And must have passed HSC examinatrion with physics, chemistry and mathematics as compulsory subject.

Workshops and laboratories

Workshops and laboratories in Shyamoli Textile Engineering College-

 Weaving Laboratory
 Apparel Laboratory
 Wet Processing Laboratory
 Knitting Laboratory
 Yarn Manufacturing Laboratory
 Quality Control Laboratory
 Mechanical Workshop
 Computer Laboratory
 Physics Laboratory
 Chemistry Laboratory
 EEE Laboratory

Club Activities

Some club activities in Shyamoli Textile Engineering College-

 STEC Tech Club
 STEC Sports Club
 STEC Debate Club
 STEC Textile and Career Club
 STEC Textile Club
 STEC Cultural Club
 Animation and Cinematography Enthusiast Society of STEC (ACESS)

References

 Department of Textiles Bangladesh
 Official site of Shyamoli Textile Engineering College
 Constituent Colleges/Institutes of The University of Dhaka
 For undergraduate admission of The University of Dhaka

Education in Bangladesh
Textile schools in Bangladesh
Universities and colleges in Dhaka